The Port of Peril is a science fiction novel by American writer Otis Adelbert Kline.  It was first published in book form in 1949 by The Grandon Company in an edition of 3,000 copies.  The novel was originally serialized in six parts in the magazine Weird Tales beginning in November 1932 under the title Buccaneers of Venus.

Plot introduction
Set on Venus, the novel concerns Robert Grandon whose wife Vernia is kidnapped by the Huitsenni, a race of pirates.  Grandon pursues them to their hidden port where, after joining forces with rebels, he overthrows their king.  He discovers that Vernia has been taken to the north.  He follows and eventually rescues his bride.  They are both then captured by the Huitsenni and must be rescued by an army of allied nations working with the Huitsenni rebels.

Reception
Astounding SF reviewer P. Schuyler Miller received the novel favorably, saying "If you like the Burroughs sheer adventure formula, this is better Burroughs than [Burroughs] has done himself for a long time."

References

Sources

Internet Archive, 

1933 American novels
1933 science fiction novels
American science fiction novels
Novels first published in serial form
Novels set on Venus
Works originally published in Weird Tales
Planetary romances